The Samsung Galaxy Avant was a mid-range smartphone released by Samsung in July 2014. It was only available on the T-Mobile network, although it could be purchased both on and off contract. This phone retailed for $230, making it one of the cheaper offerings by T-Mobile. While this phone was praised for its low price and decent performance, it was also criticized for its poor screen and camera. This screen was often cited as having washed out colors and a lack of sharpness, likely as a result of the TFT panel used. This phone did receive a few official software updates, but was never upgraded past Android KitKat.

Rooting & Custom ROMs 
Soon after the release of this phone, a method to gain root access on the Galaxy Avant was discovered. In order to root the phone, a root package must be flashed through Odin on a PC, which can then be used to flash a custom recovery, allowing for further ROMs to be flashed. Despite being rooted and having TWRP available, this device did not receive any support past Android 4.4.4, however, it did receive a modified ROM that provided some of the design and functionality of Android Marshmallow.

References 

Samsung Galaxy